The 1981–82 FA Trophy was the thirteenth season of the FA Trophy.

Preliminary round

Ties

Replays

2nd replay

First qualifying round

Ties

Replays

2nd replay

3rd replay

Second qualifying round

Ties

Replays

Third qualifying round

Ties

Replays

2nd replay

1st round
The teams that given byes to this round are Bishop's Stortford, Altrincham, Kettering Town, Scarborough, Northwich Victoria, Weymouth, Boston United, Barrow, Stafford Rangers, Worcester City, Yeovil Town, Dartford, Runcorn, Enfield, Dagenham, Nuneaton Borough, Bangor City, Bedford Town, Wycombe Wanderers, Spennymoor United, Marine, Blyth Spartans, Cheltenham Town, Mossley, Walthamstow Avenue, Dulwich Hamlet, Sutton United, Woking, Ashington, Hastings United, Aylesbury United and Slough Town.

Ties

Replays

2nd replay

2nd round

Ties

Replays

3rd round

Ties

Replays

4th round

Ties

Replay

Semi finals

First leg

Second leg

Final

References

General
 Football Club History Database: FA Trophy 1981-82

Specific

1981–82 domestic association football cups
League
1981-82